

Results

Scottish Premier Division

Final standings

Scottish League Cup

Scottish Cup

UEFA Cup

References

Aberdeen F.C. seasons
Aberdeen
Aberdeen